Joo Hyun-jung (born 3 May 1982) is a professional former world number one archer from South Korea.

2008 Summer Olympics
At the 2008 Summer Olympics in Beijing, Joo finished her ranking round with a total of 664 points, nine points behind ranking leader Park Sung-hyun. This gave her the third seed for the final competition bracket in which she faced Sigrid Romero in the first round, beating the archer from Colombia 108–98. In the second round, Joo was too strong for Natalia Valeeva (110–108) and via Bérengère Schuh (109–104) in the third round she advanced to the quarter finals. There she faced 27th seed, but local Chinese favourite Zhang Juanjuan who won the confrontation with 106–101. Zhang went on to upset Joo's South Korean teammates Park and Yun Ok-hee in the semifinal and final to take the gold medal.

Together with Park Sung-hyun and Yun Ok-hee, she also took part in the team event. With her 664 score from the ranking round combined with the 673 of Park and the 667 of Yun the South Korean team was in first position after the ranking round, which gave them a straight seed into the quarter finals. With 231-217 they were far too strong for the Italian team. The 231 also was a new World Record. In the semifinal against France, they scored 213 points with the French scoring 184, securing their final spot. Opponent China came with a strong 215 points performance, but South Korea won the gold with a 224 points score.

References

External links
 
 

Living people
South Korean female archers
Archers at the 2008 Summer Olympics
Olympic archers of South Korea
Olympic gold medalists for South Korea
Olympic medalists in archery
Asian Games medalists in archery
Medalists at the 2008 Summer Olympics
Archers at the 2010 Asian Games
Archers at the 2014 Asian Games
World Archery Championships medalists
1982 births
Asian Games gold medalists for South Korea
Medalists at the 2010 Asian Games
21st-century South Korean women